This is a list of the 658 Members of Parliament (MPs) elected to the House of Commons of the 11th Parliament of the United Kingdom at the 1832 general election, held over several days from 8 December 1832 to 8 January 1833.

A total of 401 constituencies returned members. 153 constituencies returned one member each; 240 constituencies returned two members each; 7 constituencies returned 3 members each; and one constituency returned 4 members.

Background 

1832 was the first general election in the United Kingdom of Great Britain and Ireland after the Representation of the People Act 1832 (commonly known as the "Reform Act 1832" or the "Great Reform Act") had introduced wide-ranging changes to the electoral system. The Act disenfranchised many small towns (some of which were known as rotten boroughs), reduced the number of MPs elected by some of the remaining boroughs, and created 65 new seats for the counties and 65 new seats for parliamentary boroughs.

The Act also increased the number of individuals entitled to vote, allowing a total of one out of six adult males to vote, but included the first statutory bar to women voting. The franchise was subsequently extended in several steps over the next century, culminating in the Representation of the People (Equal Franchise) Act 1928, which allowed all adult men and women to vote.

Not all constituencies voted. Where the number of candidates did not exceed the number of seats, members were returned unopposed; this was the case for 189 of the 658 members returned.

Explanatory notes

Scope 
The list of MPs records those MPs listed in the London Gazette as having been "returned to serve in the new Parliament". It does not include those subsequently elected in by-elections.

Where the election of an MP was subsequently overturned as a result of an election petition, the relevant entry in the list is shown in italics, and a footnote added to explain the circumstances. For a list of results which were overturned, see below: overturned elections.

Parties 
The party labels for MPs in this period should be treated with caution.

The source for party affiliation of MPs for constituencies in England, Scotland and Wales is F. W. S. Craig's British Parliamentary election results 1832–1885. Craig does not distinguish between Liberals, Radicals and Whigs, labeling them all as "Liberal".  Similarly, Craig does not distinguish between those who described themselves as Conservatives and those described as Tory, labeling them all as "Conservative". That convention has been followed in this list, with one variation: the label "Tory" has been used for Conservatives and Tories, because the term "Conservative" was not officially adopted by the party until 1834. Craig's volume covers only two years before that date, and 51 years after it, so "Conservative" is the more appropriate term for the period as a whole; but for 1832, it is an anachronism.

Craig warns that party affiliations in the period were fluid and cannot always be accurately assessed, and that some candidates could have been equally well described as either "Liberal" or "Conservative".

Walker's Parliamentary election results in Ireland, 1801–1922 is the source for the party affiliations of the MPs for constituencies in Ireland. Walker also uses the labels "Liberal" and "Conservative", but warns that they are an "over-simplification", noting that until 1868 neither term was used consistently by contemporaries.

A number of Irish MPs have been labelled as "Repeal", referring to the Repeal Association. Walker assigned this label to MPs who "signed the repeal pledge, advocated it at this election, or supported repeal measures in the ensuing parliament".

Types of constituency 
There were three types of constituency, each with different arrangements for the franchise:
Counties, which covered the whole of a county. In some cases they were divided into two or more divisions
University constituencies, which had no geographical basis. Their electorate comprised the graduates of the university
Parliamentary boroughs, known in Scotland as burghs, which comprised a town and in some cases some areas outside the town boundaries.
Districts of burghs (in Scotland) and districts of boroughs (in Wales) were a type of borough constituency in which several boroughs jointly elected one Member of Parliament. The areas were not geographically contiguous, and in some cases the boroughs were in different counties

List of MPs elected 

Edit by initial letter of constituencies: A–B •
C •
D–E • 
F–I •
J–L •
M–N •
O–R •
S–T •
U–Z

|}

Overturned elections 

The list of MPs records those MPs listed in the London Gazette as having been "returned to serve in the new Parliament". Where the election of an MP was subsequently overturned as a result of an election petition, the relevant entry in the list is shown in italics, and a footnote added to explain the circumstances. A total of 16 MPs in 14 constituencies were unseated, although one (Sir Charles Paget) was subsequently reinstated.

Voided elections 
The 1832 elections were declared void as a result of a petition for a total of 7 MPs in six constituencies:

Undue elections 

In 8 constituencies, a petition led to a recount and another candidate was declared elected without a further ballot being held. Nine seats changed hands in this way:

Notes and references

Sources 

London Gazette

See also
1832 United Kingdom general election
List of parliaments of the United Kingdom
List of United Kingdom Parliament constituencies (1832–1868)

1832
 List
1832 United Kingdom general election
UK MPs